Denchevtsi is a village in Dryanovo Municipality, in Gabrovo Province, in northern central Bulgaria. It is around 4 km north west of the town of Dryanovo, and around 15 km south west of Veliko Tarnovo.

References

Villages in Gabrovo Province